The Tauchen Formation is a geologic formation in Austria. It preserves fossils of Metaxytherium, dating back to the Langhian stage of the Miocene period.

See also 
 List of fossiliferous stratigraphic units in Austria

References

Further reading 
 D. P. Domning and P. Pervesler. 2012. The sirenian Metaxytherium (Mammalia: Dugongidae) in the Badenian (Middle Miocene) of Central Europe. Austrian Journal of Earth Sciences 105(3):125-160

Geologic formations of Austria
Miocene Series of Europe
Neogene Austria
Shale formations
Shallow marine deposits
Paleontology in Austria